Rosa Maria Pereira Murtinho (born October 24, 1935), known professionally as Rosamaria Murtinho, is a Brazilian actress.

Murtinho was born in Belém. She is married to the actor Mauro Mendonça.

Selected filmography
 A Muralha (1968)
 Pantanal (1990)
 A Próxima Vítima (1995)
 Corpo Dourado (1998)
 Chocolate com Pimenta (2003)
 Paraíso Tropical (2007)
 Sete Pecados (2007)
 Amor à Vida (2013)

References

External links

1935 births
Living people
People from Belém
Brazilian television actresses
Brazilian telenovela actresses